The Yamaha XV700 or Virago 700 was a Yamaha V-twin cruiser motorcycle. Made from 1984 to 1987, it was part of Yamaha's Virago line of cruisers. It was informally known as Yamaha's "tariff buster" of the US's 1983 tariff on imported motorcycles with over 700 cc of displacement. When the tariff ended in 1988, Yamaha switched back to the XV750.

See also
 Yamaha XV1100

References

Virago 700
Cruiser motorcycles
Motorcycles introduced in 1984